Sason pectinatum is a species of spider in the family Barychelidae, found in New Guinea.

References

Barychelidae
Arthropods of New Guinea
Spiders of Asia
Spiders described in 1908